The 1952–53 Norwegian 1. Divisjon season was the 14th season of ice hockey in Norway. Eight teams participated in the league, and Gamlebyen won the championship.

Regular season

External links 
 Norwegian Ice Hockey Federation

Nor
GET-ligaen seasons
1952 in Norwegian sport
1953 in Norwegian sport